Marcel Gebhardt (born 15 September 1979) is a German former football player. He made his debut on the professional league level in the 2. Bundesliga for 1. FC Köln on 1 October 1999 when he came on as a substitute for Dirk Lottner in the 73rd minute in a game against SV Waldhof Mannheim.

References

External links
 

1979 births
Living people
People from Riesa
Footballers from Saxony
German footballers
1. FC Köln players
1. FC Köln II players
1. FC Lokomotive Leipzig players
Wormatia Worms players
2. Bundesliga players
Association football midfielders